The discography of Natalie Merchant contains seven studio albums, two compilation albums, and seven singles. Merchant's debut album, Tigerlily, produced three top 10 hits, "Carnival", "Wonder", and "Jealousy". The album is certified 5× Multi-Platinum by the RIAA.

Albums

Studio albums

Live albums

Compilation albums

Extended plays

Singles

A.  Charted only on the Hot 100 Airplay chart.
B.  Charted on the Adult Alternative Songs chart.

Other appearances

References

Rock music discographies
Pop music discographies
Discographies of American artists
Discography